The Korçë Plain is the largest lowland in southeastern Albania.

In its southern side is found the Kamenica Tumulus.

References

Plains of Albania
Geography of Korçë County